Theo Brophy-Clews (born 1997) in England is a former rugby union player for London Irish.

Education
He was educated at Abingdon School and represented the school at many sports but excelled at Rugby and Rugby Sevens.

Rugby career
He joined the Academy squad at London Irish before making his senior debut during the 2014/2015 season against the Scarlets in the LV Cup and has captained the England U18s.

Brophy-Clews gained his first cap for the England U20 side against Italy at the World Rugby U20 Championship 2016.

In January 2018 he signed a new deal with London Irish.

He retired from professional rugby on medical grounds (concussion injury) in May 2021 at the age of 24.

See also
 List of Old Abingdonians

References

1997 births
People educated at Abingdon School
English rugby union players
Living people
London Irish players
Rugby union fly-halves